Abdul Ghani Assar  (born 1923) was an Afghan footballer who competed at the 1948 Summer Olympic Games. He also played for Mahmoudiyeh F.C..

References

External links
 

1923 births
Possibly living people
Afghan men's footballers
Olympic footballers of Afghanistan
Footballers at the 1948 Summer Olympics
Association football forwards